Ferdowsabad (also Romanized as Ferdowsābād) is a village in Qaleh-ye Khvajeh Rural District, in the Central District of Andika County, Khuzestan Province, Iran. At the 2006 census, its population was 231, in 44 families.
فردوس آباد روستایی در بخش مرکزی شهرستان  اندیکا می باشد

References 

Populated places in Andika County